This is a list of Cuban League baseball players who have appeared in Cuban League baseball.

Complete list of players 

The complete list is divided into four pages to reduce the size:

List of Cuban League baseball players (A–D)
List of Cuban League baseball players (E–L)
List of Cuban League baseball players (M–R)
List of Cuban League baseball players (S–Z)

References

External links
 Cuban League players at Seamheads.com

Cuban League